Season 2 may refer to:

 Season 2 (Infinite album)
 2econd Season

See also